Niall Campbell Randells Hopper (born 9 September 1935) is a Scottish retired amateur footballer who played in the Scottish League for Queen's Park as a wing half and inside forward. He represented Scotland at amateur level and made three friendly appearances for Great Britain.

Honours 
Queen's Park
 Scottish League Second Division: 1955–56

References

Scottish footballers
Scottish Football League players
Queen's Park F.C. players
Association football wing halves
1935 births
Place of birth missing (living people)
Association football forwards
Living people
Cambuslang Rangers F.C. players
Scotland amateur international footballers
Scottish Junior Football Association players
Sportspeople from Rutherglen
People educated at Rutherglen Academy
Footballers from South Lanarkshire